Andrei Ionuț David (born 28 January 1994) is a Romanian professional footballer who plays as a defender.

References

External links
 
 

1994 births
Living people
Romanian footballers
CS Pandurii Târgu Jiu players
Liga I players
Association football defenders
Sportspeople from Târgu Jiu